Nicolás Milesi Van Lommel (born 10 November 1992 in Young) is a Uruguayan professional footballer who plays for Saudi club Al-Ahli as a midfielder.

Club career
Born in Young, Milesi graduated from Club Atlético Torque's youth system.

In early 2012, Milesi travelled to Mexico to be tested by Deportivo Toluca. He remained six months playing for the youth team.

He made his professional debut on 20 October 2012 scoring a goal, in a 3–3 away draw against Rampla Juniors. He entered in the 75th minute replacing Jesús Toscanini, and 7 minutes later scored a goal.

On 7 January 2014 he moved to Danubio; however, a month later, Milesi joined Brazilian Série A side Atlético Paranaense. He never played for the first team and was sent to the reserve squad, so six months later he returned to Uruguay, and played two years for Danubio.

On 5 August 2016, Milesi signed a professional contract with Saudi Club Al-Hilal, and he won the Saudi Professional League in the first season.

On 28 January 2023, Milesi joined Saudi Arabian club Al-Ahli on a six-month contract.

Statistics 
As of 12 April 2018

Honours

Club

Al Hilal
Saudi Professional League (2): 2016–17, 2017–18
King Cup of Champions : 2017

References

External links
Atlético Paranaense official profile 

1992 births
Living people
Uruguayan footballers
Association football midfielders
Uruguayan Primera División players
Montevideo City Torque players
Danubio F.C. players
Al Hilal SFC players
Al Dhafra FC players
Al Wahda FC players
Club Libertad footballers
Club Athletico Paranaense players
Al-Ahli Saudi FC players
Campeonato Brasileiro Série A players
Expatriate footballers in Brazil
Uruguayan expatriate footballers
Uruguayan expatriate sportspeople in Brazil
Uruguayan expatriate sportspeople in Saudi Arabia
Expatriate footballers in Saudi Arabia
Uruguayan expatriate sportspeople in the United Arab Emirates
Expatriate footballers in the United Arab Emirates
Uruguayan expatriate sportspeople in Paraguay
Expatriate footballers in Paraguay
Saudi Professional League players
UAE Pro League players
Paraguayan Primera División players
Saudi First Division League players